Krasnoye Ekho is a settlement in Vladimir Oblast, Russia, located on the Poboyki River,  south-east of Vladimir.  Population: 

It was founded as the settlement of Novgorodino in 1875, when merchant Komissarov built the Novo-Gorodinsky glass-works here (renamed "Krasnoye Ekho" in 1924).  In 1940, it was granted urban-type settlement status in 1940 and demoted back in status to that of a rural locality in 2005.

The modern name of the settlement comes from the Krasnoye Ekho glass-works; one of the oldest glass-works in Russia.

References

External links
Official website of the Krasnoye Ekho glass-works 

Rural localities in Gus-Khrustalny District